The Aces was one of the earliest and most influential of the electric Chicago blues bands in the 1950s, led by the guitarist brothers Louis and Dave Myers, natives of Byhalia, Mississippi.

Career 
The Myers brothers originally performed as the Little Boys. With the addition of harmonica player Junior Wells, they became the Three Deuces and then the Three Aces. With the enlistment of the drummer Fred Below in 1950, they became the Four Aces and finally the Aces. Influenced by jazz, their music led to the rise of the blues shuffle beat and helped launch the drums to a new prominence in blues bands.

In 1952, Wells quit to join the Muddy Waters band, filling the vacancy created by the recent departure of Little Walter from that group. Walter quickly signed the remaining Aces as his new backing unit, renaming the trio the Jukes to capitalize on his current hit single, "Juke". A series of seminal recordings followed — "Mean Old World," "Sad Hours," "Off the Wall," and "Tell Me Mama" among them, until Louis Myers left the band in 1954. The resulting gradual dissolution of the Jukes as Little Walter's band freed the members to reform as a backing band for other Chicago blues musicians, including Otis Rush, Eddie Boyd, and others.

In the late 1950s, Dave Myers switched from the guitar to the electric bass, becoming one of the first Chicago bluesmen to adopt this relatively new instrument and helping to popularize it in Chicago blues. During the 1960s, 1970s and 1980s the original Aces periodically reunited for recordings, tours, and festivals.

Personnel
Louis Myers, September 18, 1929 – September 5, 1994
Dave Myers, October 30, 1926 – September 3, 2001
Fred Below, September 16, 1926 – August 14, 1988

References

American blues musicians
Chicago blues ensembles
People from Byhalia, Mississippi